King of Peace Episcopal Church is an Episcopal church located at 6230 Laurel Island Parkway, Kingsland, Georgia. It is a parish of the Diocese of Georgia created in 2000. The church first met in a house on its present site and built a church building in 2004, giving away the house to be a home once more. The church has a 43,000-marble tile labyrinth in the floor of its sanctuary.

The church created King of Peace Episcopal Day School in 2004 as a full-day, full-year preschool for children age 18 months to five years which operates in the same building. In 2009, the school was named a Center of Distinction by the State of Georgia's licensing division, making it a model day care facility for other schools. That same year, the school purchased  in St. Marys to be developed as a private school with the preschool to remain at King of Peace Church. The church is actively involved in the community through Scouting, Habitat for Humanity and more. In 2010, King of Peace became a parish of the Diocese of Georgia, moving from its previous status as a mission congregation.

Weekly Services
Sunday Eucharists - 8:30 and 10 am
Wednesday Eucharist - 6:15pm

See also

Kingsland, Georgia
Episcopal Church in the United States of America
Episcopal Diocese of Georgia

References

External links
King of Peace Episcopal Church Website

Buildings and structures in Camden County, Georgia
Episcopal church buildings in Georgia (U.S. state)